
NVC community W10 (Quercus robur - Pteridium aquilinum - Rubus fruticosus woodland) is one of the woodland communities in the British National Vegetation Classification system. It is one of the six communities falling in the "mixed deciduous and oak/birch woodlands" group.

This is a widely distributed community, except in Scotland. There are five subcommunities.

Community composition

Four constant species are found in this community:
 English Oak (Quercus robur)
 Honeysuckle (Lonicera periclymenum)
 Bracken (Pteridium aquilinum)
 Bramble (Rubus fruticosus agg.)

No rare species are also associated with the community.

Distribution

This community is widespread throughout lowland areas of England and Wales. It extends into lowland southern and eastern areas of Scotland, but in the west, it is replaced by community W11.

Subcommunities

There are five subcommunities:
 the so-called typical subcommunity
 the Anemone nemorosa subcommunity
 the Hedera helix subcommunity
 the Holcus lanatus subcommunity
 the Acer pseudoplatanus - Oxalis acetosella subcommunity

References

 Rodwell, J. S. (1991) British Plant Communities Volume 1 - Woodlands and scrub  (hardback),  (paperback)

W10